Spires of Spirit, by Gael Baudino, is a collection of six novellas set in the universe of  The Strands Series. It was first published in 1997 by Roc Books.  The first three stories take place in the time period just prior to Strands of Starlight and second three take place in 1990s Denver, USA, about ten years after the flashforwards in Shroud of Shadow and before the events depicted in Strands of Sunlight.

In the introduction to this book, the author has this to say about the six short stories:

Charity
This story details how Andrew the carpenter, Francis the blacksmith, and Varden the Elf help the Leather Woman escape her life of misery.

Lady of Light
This story details how Jacques Alban, Saint Brigid's priest, tries to force David the woodcarver to carve a cross for Saint Brigid's church and what happens as a result.

A Touch of Distant Hands
This story details how memories of Charity's old life come back to haunt her and the plan that Roxanne the weaver and Varden the Elf devise to save her sanity.

Elvenhome
This story details how Joan Buckland, owner of Buckland Employment Agency, hires Wheat Hennock, and how that triggers the Elven blood in her.

Please Come Home to Denver (in the Spring)
This story details how Lauri Tonso goes to work at Treestar Surveying, which is run by Hadden, and begins to experience the awakening of Elven blood in her.

The Shadow of the Starlight
This story details how Lauri, now an Elf, triggers the transformation in her new secretary Amy, who is suffering domestic abuse at the hands of Rob, her boyfriend, and how she finds power beyond belief during the process.
This story was published in slightly different form in the April 1985 issue of The Magazine of Fantasy and Science Fiction.

The differences, aside from minor editing changes, between the two versions are:
In the 1985 F&SF version, Elves sweat.  In the 1997 version, they don't.
In the 1985 F&SF version, Elvenhome has a radiophone.  In the 1997 version, it is a regular phone.
In the 1985 F&SF version, there are several Elvish phrases dispersed throughout. In the 1997 version, all dialogue is in English.
In the 1985 F&SF version, Rob uses a .22 caliber handgun to shoot Hadden.  In the 1997 version, it is a .38 caliber handgun.
In the 1985 F&SF version, several expletives from Rob's dialogue are missing, relative to the 1997 version.

American fantasy novels